Long Pond is a  pond in Rochester, Massachusetts. The pond is connected to Snipatuit Pond, where its outflow goes. The water quality is impaired due to toxic metals.

External links
Environmental Protection Agency

Ponds of Plymouth County, Massachusetts
Rochester, Massachusetts
Ponds of Massachusetts